Rudolf Dombi (born 9 November 1986) is a Hungarian sprint canoer. He and his partner Roland Kökény won the gold medal at the 2012 Summer Olympics in the K-2 1000 metres event.

References

Hungarian male canoeists
1986 births
Living people
Olympic canoeists of Hungary
Canoeists at the 2012 Summer Olympics
Olympic gold medalists for Hungary
Olympic medalists in canoeing
Medalists at the 2012 Summer Olympics
Canoeists from Budapest
21st-century Hungarian people